The Taleyfac Spanish Bridge, known locally as Taleyfac Tolai Acho, is a historic stone arch bridge off Guam Highway 2 in Agat, Guam. It originally had wood timber flooring, which has long ago been replaced. One of the arches has been damaged by the removal or loss by erosion of some of its stones.

The bridge was built between 1866 and the United States' acquisition of Guam in 1898, when Guam was under Spanish colonial administration.  It was listed on the National Register of Historic Places in 1974.

See also
National Register of Historic Places listings in Guam
List of bridges on the National Register of Historic Places in Guam

References 

Road bridges on the National Register of Historic Places in Guam
Bridges in Guam
1800s establishments in the Spanish East Indies
1800s establishments in Oceania
19th-century establishments in Guam
Stone arch bridges in the United States
Agat, Guam